Broughton Harris (August 16, 1822—January 19, 1899) was a Vermont businessman and political figure.  He was Secretary and Treasurer of Utah Territory, and became one of the Runaway Officials of 1851.

Early life
Harris was born in Chesterfield, New Hampshire on August 16, 1822. He was the son of Wilder Harris and Harriet ( Davies) Harris.

He attended Chesterfield Academy and Kimball Union Academy, and graduated from Dartmouth College in 1845.  In college he was a member of Phi Beta Kappa and Alpha Delta Phi.

Career
Harris studied law briefly before embarking on a career as a journalist as editor of The Vermont Phoenix and editor and publisher of The Semi-Weekly Eagle, both Whig party newspapers. From 1847 to 1850 Harris was Register of Probate for the Marlboro District.

Secretary of Utah Territory
In 1850, President Millard Fillmore appointed Harris as Secretary and Treasurer of the newly organized Utah Territory.  Harris and two other federal appointees were unable to work cooperatively with territorial Governor Brigham Young, and left the territory without replacements being named.

After an investigation determined that Harris and the other officials had fled the territory without cause, the Fillmore administration ordered the men to return to their posts in the Territory or surrender their commissions. Harris and the others refused and were thus dropped from the territorial government. Harris was subsequently offered appointment as Secretary and acting Governor of New Mexico Territory, which he declined.

American Civil War
Harris settled in Brattleboro, Vermont.  He became a Republican when the party was founded, and he served in the Vermont Senate from 1860 to 1862.

Harris was also one of Vermont's Delegates to the Peace Conference of 1861, which unsuccessfully attempted to prevent the start of the American Civil War.

Later career
Harris became a partner in Harris Brothers & Company, one of the largest railroad construction corporations in the country, and he was also President of the Brattleboro Savings Bank.

In 1884 Harris was a Delegate to the Republican National Convention.

Personal life
In 1851 Harris married Sarah Buell Hollister, daughter of New York City businessman Edwin M. Hollister. Sarah's nephew was banker and real estate investor Walter E. Maynard. They honeymooned while en route to Salt Lake City for Harris to begin his duties as territorial Secretary. Sarah authored a journal of her 1851 honeymoon trip to Salt Lake City, her experiences in Utah Territory, and the return trip after her husband left his position as territorial Secretary.  This journal was later published as An Unwritten Chapter of Salt Lake. Together, they were the parents of a daughter:

 Mary Buell Harris, who married attorney and writer John Seymour Wood.

Broughton Harris died in Brattleboro on January 19, 1899.  He was buried at Brattleboro's Prospect Hill Cemetery.

References

1822 births
1899 deaths
People from Chesterfield, New Hampshire
People from Brattleboro, Vermont
Dartmouth College alumni
Vermont Whigs
19th-century American politicians
Vermont Republicans
Vermont state senators
People of Vermont in the American Civil War
Politics of Utah Territory
Utah War
Utah Territory officials
American bank presidents
19th-century American newspaper publishers (people)